The 2003 Acropolis Rally (formally the 50th Golden Acropolis Rally) was the sixth round of the 2003 World Rally Championship. The race was held over three days between 6 June and 8 June 2003, and was based in Lamia, Greece. Ford's Markko Märtin won the race, his 1st win in the World Rally Championship.

Background

Entry list

Itinerary
All dates and times are EEST (UTC+3).

Results

Overall

World Rally Cars

Classification

Special stages

Championship standings

Junior World Rally Championship

Classification

Special stages

Championship standings

References

External links 

 Official website of the World Rally Championship

Greece
Acropolis Rally
2003 in Greek sport